Crannell may refer to:
Crannell, California
Annalisa Crannell, American mathematician, daughter of Carol Jo
Carol Jo Crannell, American astrophysicist, mother of Annalisa
Todd Crannell, American sports agent
Bartholomew Crannell Beardsley (1775-1855), lawyer, judge and political figure in Upper Canada and New Brunswick
Florence Crannell Means (1891-1980), American writer for children and young adults
Robert Crannell Minor (1839-1904), American artist

See also
Crandell (disambiguation)